Beau Michael Brinkley (born January 25, 1990) is an American football long snapper for the Atlanta Falcons of the National Football League (NFL). He played college football at Missouri.

College career
Brinkley played college football at the University of Missouri. In his four years at Missouri, he finished with 12 tackles. In his senior season, he recorded 5 tackles for the season. In his junior year, Brinkley was the team's long snapper for the third consecutive season. In his sophomore year, he was selected as the MU Special Teams MVP. In his freshman year, Brinkley was selected as the MU Walk-on MVP.

Professional career

Tennessee Titans
On April 30, 2012, Brinkley signed with the Tennessee Titans as an undrafted free agent. He made his NFL debut against the New England Patriots on September 9, 2012.

On March 8, 2015, Brinkley signed a five-year contract extension with the Titans worth $5.75 million.

On September 30, 2018, in a 26-23 overtime victory against the Philadelphia Eagles, Brinkley played his 100th career game. The Titans finished with their third consecutive 9-7 season, but did not qualify for the playoffs, with Brinkley snapping for punter Brett Kern as he was named to his second consecutive Pro Bowl and was named Second-team All-Pro.

Entering the final year of his contract, Brinkley signed a multi-year contract extension with the Titans on September 6, 2019. During the season, he snapped for Brett Kern as he was named to his third consecutive Pro Bowl and was named First-team All-Pro. On December 18, 2019, Brinkley was announced to be a Pro Bowl alternate for the 2020 Pro Bowl. The Titans finished with a fourth consecutive 9-7 record and qualified for the playoffs, where they won upsets over the New England Patriots and the Baltimore Ravens before losing to eventual Super Bowl champions, the Kansas City Chiefs in the AFC Championship Game.

On September 29, 2020, Brinkley, along with DaQuan Jones and practice squad player Tommy Hudson were placed on the reserve/COVID-19 list by the team. He was activated on October 11. Brinkley was released on November 3.

Detroit Lions
On September 25, 2021, Brinkley was signed to the Detroit Lions practice squad, but was released two days later.

Arizona Cardinals
On November 12, 2021, Brinkley was signed to the Arizona Cardinals practice squad. He was promoted to the active roster on November 20. He was waived on November 22 and re-signed to the practice squad. He was promoted back to the active roster on December 4. He was released on December 14.

Los Angeles Chargers
On December 28, 2021, Brinkley was signed to the Los Angeles Chargers practice squad. He was released on January 3, 2022.

Chicago Bears
On February 16, 2022, Brinkley was signed to the Chicago Bears. He was released by the team on March 17.

Atlanta Falcons
On April 4, 2022, Brinkley signed a one-year contract with the Atlanta Falcons. On May 2, 2022, he was placed on Injured reserve.

References

External links
 Missouri Tigers bio
 Tennessee Titans bio

1990 births
Living people
American football long snappers
Missouri Tigers football players
Players of American football from Kansas City, Missouri
Tennessee Titans players
Detroit Lions players
Arizona Cardinals players
Los Angeles Chargers players
Chicago Bears players
Atlanta Falcons players